The Huguenot Society of America is a hereditary patriotic society, organized in New York City on April 12, 1883, and incorporated on June 12, 1885.

About

The Huguenot Society of America is a New York City–based genealogical organization. On April 12, 1883, the Society was inaugurated by a group of descendants of Huguenots who had fled persecution in France and who (or whose descendants) settled in what is now the United States of America. The purpose of the Society is primarily to promote the cause of religious freedom and to perpetuate the memory of the Huguenot settlers. Its first president was John Jay—lawyer, diplomat, abolitionist, and grandson of the first Chief Justice of the United States.
 
Today, the Huguenot Society of America has members in forty-three of the fifty States, the District of Columbia, Great Britain, Italy, and the Netherlands. The Society maintains an extensive library of books relating to Huguenot history; preserves pictures, sculptures, and artifacts relating to the Huguenots; presents lectures on topics of Huguenot interest; supports important research in Huguenot history; and gives annual scholarships to American Huguenot descendants attending selected colleges and universities. 
 
The Huguenot Society of America is sometimes confused with the similarly named but unaffiliated National Huguenot Society, which was founded in 1956.

Notable members
 John Jay (lawyer)
 Martha J. Lamb
 Henry Gurdon Marquand
 Frederic James de Peyster
 Jacqueline Noel

References

External links

Organizations based in New York City
Huguenot history in the United States
1883 establishments in the United States